The Blue Point Sprint formerly Meydan Sprint, is a horse race run over a distance of 1,000 metres (five furlongs) on turf in February at Meydan Racecourse in Dubai. It was first contested in 2012.

The Meydan Sprint became a Listed race in 2013. The race was elevated to Group 3 level in 2013 and became a Group 2 event in 2019. Since 2022, it has been run as the Blue Point Sprint.

Records
Record time:
0:55.90 - Ertijaal 2018

Most successful horse (2 wins):
 2 - Shea Shea – 2013, 2014
 2 - Ertijaal – 2017, 2018

Most wins by a jockey:
 3 - Jim Crowley – 2017, 2018, 2020

Most wins by a trainer:
 2 - Mike de Kock 2013, 2014
 2 - Ali Al Rayhi 2017, 2018

Most wins by an owner:
 4 - Hamdan Al Maktoum 2016, 2017, 2018, 2020

Winners

See also
 List of United Arab Emirates horse races

References

Horse races in the United Arab Emirates
Recurring events established in 2012
2012 establishments in the United Arab Emirates